Weak countries have no diplomacy, or weak nations have no diplomacy, is a phrase said by Lu Zhengxiang, the first Minister of Foreign Affairs (that is, Foreign Minister) of the Republic of China in 1945. He looked back on the humiliating history of modern China, with its rocky road and many disasters, and was inspired to say so.

The earliest person in history to state that "weak countries have no diplomacy" was Zhuge Liang, the prime minister of Shu during the period of the Three Kingdoms. Its true meaning is that only when a country is strong can it have a real voice and influence in international affairs.

References 

1945 in China
Chinese words and phrases
20th century in international relations